Matthew James Dickins (born 3 September 1970) is an English former professional footballer who played as a goalkeeper.

Career
Born in Sheffield, West Riding of Yorkshire, Dickins attended All Saints RC Comprehensive school on Granville Road.

Despite being a Sheffield Wednesday fan at school, Dickins began his career as a 19-year-old trainee with Sheffield United. After three years at Bramall Lane with no first-team appearances to his name, he signed for Lincoln City. Despite only making 27 league starts for the Imps, Kenny Dalglish, then manager of Premier League side Blackburn Rovers, saw his promise and signed him as cover for Bobby Mimms for a £250,000 fee in March 1992. He made only one appearance for Rovers, but was a member of the squad that won the Premier League championship in 1995.

During his three years at Ewood Park, Dickins was loaned out to four clubs: Blackpool, his old club Lincoln, Grimsby, and Rochdale.

For the 1995–96 season, he made a permanent move to Stockport, then managed by Dave Jones.

When he played for Altrincham during the 1996–97 campaign, he became only the club's sixth goalkeeper to be an ever-present.

Notes

References

Profile at Playerhistory.com

1970 births
Living people
Footballers from Sheffield
English footballers
Association football goalkeepers
Sheffield F.C. players
Sheffield United F.C. players
Leyton Orient F.C. players
Lincoln City F.C. players
Blackburn Rovers F.C. players
Blackpool F.C. players
Grimsby Town F.C. players
Rochdale A.F.C. players
Stockport County F.C. players
Altrincham F.C. players
Boston United F.C. players
People educated at All Saints Catholic High School, Sheffield